Céline Guivarc'h is a French climate scientist modelling the impact of climate change from a multidisciplinary perspective and how to limit it. She is a research director at École des Ponts ParisTech. She is a member of the French High Council on Climate and a lead author on the IPCC Sixth Assessment Report (Working Group 3).

She was the recipient of the French Minister of Higher Education, Research and Innovation Irène Joliot-Curie Prize in 2020.

Education and career 
Guivarch studied at the prestigious French engineering school École Polytechnique and conducted her doctoral 
research on the evaluation of the cost of climate policies at the International Center on Environment and development (CIRED).

Awards and honours 
 2020 Irène Joliot-Curie Prize

References

External links
Céline Guivarch – CIRED

Living people
French climatologists
Academic staff of École des Ponts ParisTech
École Polytechnique alumni
Intergovernmental Panel on Climate Change contributing authors
Year of birth missing (living people)